Jasenovac, Croatia may refer to:

 Jasenovac, Sisak-Moslavina County, a town and municipality in Croatia, the location of the Jasenovac concentration camp
 Jasenovac, Osijek-Baranja County, a village in the Kneževi Vinogradi municipality in Croatia
 Jasenovac Zagorski, a village in the Krapinske Toplice municipality in Croatia

See also
 Jasenovac (disambiguation)